Bernard Ahiafor (born 6 February 1973) is a Ghanaian politician and a Member of Parliament representing the Akatsi South in the Volta Region on the ticket of the National Democratic Congress.

Personal life and education 
Bernard Ahiafor hails from Atidzive. He obtained an O Level from Abor Senior High School, and Bachelor’s Degree from the University of Ghana.

References 

1973 births
Living people
National Democratic Congress (Ghana) politicians
Ghanaian MPs 2013–2017
Ghanaian MPs 2017–2021
Ghanaian MPs 2021–2025